is a former Japanese football player and manager.

Playing career
Shimizu was born in Tokyo on November 4, 1954. After graduating from Hosei University, he joined Nissan Motors in 1977. He retired in 1988.

Coaching career
After retirement, Shimizu became an assistant coach at Nissan Motors (later Yokohama Marinos) in 1989. In 1991, he was promoted to manager and managed until 1994. In 1996, he signed with Avispa Fukuoka. In 1998, he became an assistant coach for Kyoto Purple Sanga. In June, he was promoted to manager, but he was sacked in June 1999. In August 1999, he became a manager for J2 League club Vegalta Sendai. In 2001 season, he led to the 2nd place and the club was promoted to J1 League. In September 2003, he was sacked.

Managerial statistics

References

External links

Vegalta Sendai

1954 births
Living people
Hosei University alumni
Association football people from Tokyo
Japanese footballers
Japan Soccer League players
Yokohama F. Marinos players
Japanese football managers
J1 League managers
J2 League managers
Yokohama F. Marinos managers
Avispa Fukuoka managers
Kyoto Sanga FC managers
Vegalta Sendai managers
Association football midfielders